Charles John MacDonald (April 4, 1841, Halifax, Nova Scotia – October 12, 1903, Halifax, Nova Scotia) was a lawyer and political figure in Nova Scotia, Canada. He represented Halifax County in the Nova Scotia House of Assembly from 1878 to 1879 as a Liberal-Conservative member. He was a member of the North British Society.

Biography 
He was born in Halifax, the son of Robert MacDonald, an immigrant from Scotland. MacDonald was educated at Dalhousie College and was called to the Nova Scotia bar in 1872. He married Mary Tamson Evens. He later married Annie McLearn after the death of his first wife. MacDonald was lieutenant-colonel in the militia and served in the Halifax Provisional Battalion during the North-West Rebellion.  He also served on Halifax city council. MacDonald was a prominent member of the Freemasons. He resigned his seat in the provincial assembly in 1879 after he was named post office inspector for Halifax.

References
The Canadian parliamentary companion and annual register, 1879, CH Mackintosh

External links
 

1831 births
1903 deaths
Progressive Conservative Association of Nova Scotia MLAs
Canadian Militia officers